St Valentines Massacre (SVM) is an American metalcore band from Tampa, Florida, formed in 2005. The band consists of lead vocalist Tony Rodriguez, guitarist/vocalist Paul Zakar, bassist Alan Olshefski, lead guitarist Tyler Martin, and percussionist Andre Canale. Since their formation, SVM has issued three indie EP releases: Of Heroes and Gods, Beneath Crimson Skies, and The Eulogy Sessions. In January 2007, they won the Rock Solid Pressure industry showcase, as well as placing at Emergenza and other events. The band played the Ernie Ball stage as part of the 2007 Warped Tour, and went on their own national tour in 2009.

History
The band has played shows in around 30 states, and also joined the Vans Warped Tour.

In October 2008, SVM signed with MRI Records and released their debut album, Awakening, in June 2009 on Sony RED.

Members
Tony Rodriguez - Lead Vocals
Paul Zakar - Rhythm Guitar, Vocals
Alan Olshefski - Bass
Tyler Martin - Lead Guitar
Andre Canale - Drums, Percussion
Jeremy Suarez Drums, Percussion

References

External links 
Official Website
 Rock Solid Pressure

Metalcore musical groups from Florida